Kyeemagh is a suburb in southern Sydney, in the state of New South Wales, Australia. It is 12 kilometres south of the Sydney central business district, on the western shore of Botany Bay.  Kyeemagh is in the local government area of the Bayside Council and is part of the St George area.

History
Kyeemagh is an Aboriginal name meaning 'beautiful dawn'. Prior to European settlement it was part of the lands of the Cadigal people.

The name of the suburb was adopted from the name of the Polo Ground established in the area in 1929 (Sydney Morning Herald 4 July 1929 p15). To provide better access to the ground from the north a new bridge was constructed over the Cook's River (Sydney Morning Herald 28 June 1930 p20). The new polo ground was also used for playing cricket.
 
In the 1920s, the area was known as North Brighton. A map of the area showing the existing streets was included in the Commonwealth Electoral Rolls of that period. 

The area between the Cooks River and Georges River was originally known as Seven Mile Beach. It was changed to Lady Robinson's Beach in 1874 to honour Governor Sir Hercules Robinson's wife. Cook Park is named after Samuel Cook who advocated it as a public pleasure area. 

John Webb was given a  land grant in 1837 but did not settle on the land because it was too scrubby and arid for farming. In 1882,  were resumed for a sewage farm and another  were added later. The sewage farm was discontinued in 1916 when an ocean outfall was built and subdivision took place.

John Goode had property in West Botany Street, from which he built a private road to Seven Mile Beach, as Lady Robinsons Beach was known then. Goode Street was named in his honour, but this later became Bestic Street. Maps (Commonwealth Electoral Rolls, 1925, 1928) show a second street named in honour of John Goode, off Bestic Street.

Geography
Kyeemagh is a quiet, residential district located in a triangle of land with Lady Robinsons Beach to the east, Cooks River and Muddy Creek forming a northwest boundary and Bestic Street bordering the south. Maps in Commonwealth Electoral Rolls show no development in the area in 1909 (Lang/Rockdale) or 1915(Illawarra/Rockdale). Maps in the 1925 and 1928 Rolls (Barton/Rockdale) show a very dense, cramped settlement, Filby Estate, between Goode Street and the bay. Adair Street and Annie Street lie east from Goode Street. Other streets include Coy, Derby, Henry and William Streets. There appear to be numerous other lanes and walking tracks in the settlement. None have persisted. This settlement was replaced by a larger, more sparsely-populated suburb named Kyeemagh. The area was served by a bus route between the shopping centres of Rockdale and Brighton Le Sands.

Landmarks

Kyeemagh is located on the southern bank of the Cooks River and the eastern bank of Muddy Creek. Lady Robinson Beach and Cook Park run along the eastern border. A small group of shops is located in Bestic Street near General Holmes Drive. Other parks include Kyeemagh Reserve and Lance Stoddert Reserve.

The Brighton Le Sands Amateur Fisherman's Association and TS Sirius, an Australian Navy Cadet unit, is located in Bestic Street, beside Muddy Creek. C-side restaurant, part of the Cyprus-Hellene Club (formerly the site of Hashams take-away shop), is located in Cooks Park, on General Holmes Drive, close to the beach.

The Endeavour Bridge links Kyeemagh to Sydney Airport, Botany and Mascot. The entrance of the M5 Motorway is also located here which links to Arncliffe, Kingsgrove, Beverly Hills and west to Liverpool and Campbelltown. Kyeemagh Public School is located on Beehag and Jacobson Avenues.

Population
According to the 2016 census of Population, there were 919 people usually resident in Kyeemagh. The most common reported ancestries were Greek 19.7%, Australian 14.0%, English 10.0%, Lebanese 6.2% and Italian 5.2%. 56.3% of people were born in Australia. 43.6% of people spoke only English at home. Other languages spoken at home included Greek at 21.4%. The most common responses for religious affiliation were Eastern Orthodox 27.0%, Catholic 24.5% and No Religion 14.2%.

References

Suburbs of Sydney
Botany Bay
Bayside Council
Kyeemagh, New South Wales